Jackson is a city and county seat of Jackson County, Minnesota, United States.  The population was 3,299 at the 2010 census.

History
Jackson was originally called Springfield, and under the latter name was laid out in 1856. A post office called Jackson has been in operation since 1858.

On March 26 1857 the Wahpekute Dakota Chief Inkpaduta and his band attacked the settlement heading north after the Spirit Lake Massacre.  There were 11 able bodied men in Springfield and three  men, three children and one woman died as a result.  Lost to the raiders were 12 horses, dry goods, lead and powder.  The sole survivor of the Spirit Lake attack was 14 year old Abbie Gardner.

Geography

The city lies along Interstate 90, which runs east to west the entire width of southern Minnesota. Interstate 90 and U.S. Highway 71 are two of the main routes in the city.  Jackson is located near the center of the county of the same name.  To the south is the Iowa Lakes region, which comprises Spirit Lake, West Okoboji Lake and several other small lakes.

Demographics

2010 census
As of the census of 2010, there were 3,299 people, 1,489 households, and 856 families living in the city. The racial makeup of the city was 93.3% White, 0.5% African American, 0.4% Native American, 3.4% Asian, 0.8% from other races, and 1.6% from two or more races. Hispanic or Latino of any race were 1.8% of the population.

There were 1,489 households, of which 27.2% had children under the age of 18 living with them, 42.6% were married couples living together, 10.3% had a female householder with no husband present, 4.5% had a male householder with no wife present, and 42.5% were non-families. 37.9% of all households were made up of individuals, and 16.1% had someone living alone who was 65 years of age or older. The average household size was 2.17 and the average family size was 2.84.

The median age in the city was 40.8 years. 22.7% of residents were under the age of 18; 8.4% were between the ages of 18 and 24; 23.1% were from 25 to 44; 26.4% were from 45 to 64; and 19.3% were 65 years of age or older. The gender makeup of the city was 48.4% male and 51.6% female.

2000 census
As of the census of 2000, there were 3,501 people, 1,487 households, and 887 families living in the city. The racial makeup of the city was 94.03% White, 0.26% African American, 0.17% Native American, 4.03% Asian, 0.77% from other races, and 0.74% from two or more races. Hispanic or Latino of any race were 1.51% of the population.

There were 1,487 households, out of which 27.2% had children under the age of 18 living with them, 49.0% were married couples living together, 7.9% had a female householder with no husband present, and 40.3% were non-families. 36.3% of all households were made up of individuals, and 16.5% had someone living alone who was 65 years of age or older.  The average household size was 2.24 and the average family size was 2.93.

In the city, the population was spread out, with 23.3% under the age of 18, 9.5% from 18 to 24, 24.5% from 25 to 44, 20.5% from 45 to 64, and 22.2% who were 65 years of age or older.  The median age was 40 years. For every 100 females, there were 94.2 males.  For every 100 females age 18 and over, there were 89.8 males.

The median income for a household in the city was $33,452, and the median income for a family was $42,553. Males had a median income of $30,503 versus $21,676 for females. The per capita income for the city was $18,444.  About 4.6% of families and 11.1% of the population were below the poverty line, including 17.4% of those under age 18 and 9.4% of those age 65 or over.

Historic sites
 Ashley Park Olson-Slaabakken cabin, Jackson County's oldest structure.
 Fort Belmont 1873 farmhouse, blacksmith shop, log cabin and stockade, 1902 Delafield Lutheran Church.
 Jackson County Fair Village 20 historical buildings and is located at the Jackson County Fairgrounds
 Jackson County Historical Society and Museum west of Jackson at Lakefield, Minnesota, provides a look back at the County's history.
 Jackson County Courthouse Constructed in 1908 with murals adorning the Court Room and Rotunda, listed on the National Register of Historic Places

Economy
Though largely a farming community, Jackson has a large industrial park with such businesses as: AGCO, Last-Deck, USF Holland, New Fashion Pork, HitchDoc, and Pioneer.  AGCO and Challenger tractors are manufactured in Jackson.

Government
Jackson is located in Minnesota's 1st congressional district, represented by Republican Brad Finstad.  At the state level, Jackson is located in Senate District 22, represented by Republican Doug Magnus, and in House District 22B, represented by Republican Brian Pfarr.

Transportation
The city-owned Jackson Municipal Airport
is located 2.3 miles (3.7 km) north of Jackson's central business district.

Media

Television

Notable people
David Ellefson former Megadeth bassist
Bjarne Elgar Grottunn Minnesota State Senator who was raised in Jackson.

References

External links

 City of Jackson Official Website
 History of Jackson, MN

Cities in Minnesota
Cities in Jackson County, Minnesota
County seats in Minnesota
1856 establishments in Minnesota Territory
Populated places established in 1856